Anniversary – 10 Years of Hits is an album by American country music artist George Jones released on October 30, 1982, on the Epic Records label. It went gold in 1989. The CD edition was issued in 1990.

Background
Although Jones's pre-Epic recordings had been repackaged and compiled countless times, Anniversary - 10 Years of Hits was the first comprehensive collection of the singer's biggest hits with the label.  It contains all of his number one hits with Epic over the previous decade: "The Grand Tour" (1974), "The Door" (1975), "He Stopped Loving Her Today" (1980), and "Still Doin' Time" (1981).  The set does not contain his chart toppers with ex-wife Tammy Wynette from the period (1973's "We're Gonna Hold On", 1976's "Golden Ring", and 1977's "Near You").  For many casual country fans, this would be the only Jones album that they owned.  Stephen Thomas Erlewine of AllMusic observes: "What makes Anniversary transcendent, one of the best country albums of all time, is the context and subtext, how it reads like an autobiography of the most turbulent, heartbreaking decade in Jones' life."   It went gold in 1989 and a CD edition was issued in 1990.  All the songs are produced by Billy Sherrill.

Track listing

Vinyl

CD
The CD release reverses the order of sides 2 and 3.

Charts

Weekly charts

Year-end charts

Certifications

References

External links
 George Jones' Official Website
 Record Label

1982 greatest hits albums
Albums produced by Billy Sherrill
George Jones compilation albums
Epic Records compilation albums